Torodora crassidigitata is a moth in the family Lecithoceridae. It was described by Hou-Hun Li in 2010. It is found in Yunnan, China.

The wingspan is 18-20.5 mm. The forewings are fuscous, narrow and elongate, slightly protruded at the apex. The costal margin has a small yellowish-white spot at the distal one-fourth and there is an obvious deep brown discal spot in the cell. The hindwings are pale brown.

Etymology
The species name refers to the stout digitate caudal process of the juxta in the male genitalia and is derived from the Latin prefix crass (meaning thick) and Latin digitatus (meaning finger like).

References

Moths described in 2010
Torodora